Dungeon Drawings is a 1981 fantasy role-playing game supplement.

Contents
Dungeon Drawings is a book of illustrations representing a variety of dungeon scenery to depict rooms and corridors with appropriate furnishings and assorted debris.

Reception
Denis Loubet reviewed Dungeon Drawings in The Space Gamer No. 41. Loubet commented that "Unless you have a game master who is VERY hard up for ideas I cannot justify the purchase of this play aid. The childlike graphics and cheapness of production make this set almost worthless."

References

Fantasy role-playing game supplements
Role-playing game supplements introduced in 1981